Ruby Ridge is a  mountain ridge in the Kaniksu National Forest (administered as part of the Idaho Panhandle National Forests) in southern Boundary County, Idaho, United States.

The landform gained notoriety when an armed standoff named after the ridge occurred nearby in late August 1992, in which two civilians and one officer of the United States Marshals Service were killed.

References

External links

Ridges of Idaho
Landforms of Boundary County, Idaho
Idaho Panhandle National Forest